The S7 is a railway service of the St. Gallen S-Bahn that provides half-hourly service between  and , with hourly service from Romanshorn to . On weekends, some trains continue from Rorschach to St. Margrethen, Bregenz (Vorarlberg, Austria) and Lindau (Bavaria, Germany) along the shores of Lake Constance. 

THURBO, a joint venture of Swiss Federal Railways and the canton of Thurgau, operates the service.

Operations 
It is the only service on that section of the line. The S10 makes local stops over the line. On Saturdays and Sundays, one train every two hours operates between Romanshorn and  via .

Route 

  –  –  (–  –  – Lindau-Reutin, only every other hour during weekends)

 Weinfelden
 
 Romanshorn
 
 
 
 
 
 
 Rorschach
 St. Margrethen
 Bregenz
 Lindau-Reutin

History 
With the December 2021 timetable change, the Romanshorn–Rorschach trains were extended every two hours, on Saturdays and Sundays only, around the southern coast of Lake Constance to Bregenz and Lindau.

References

External links 
 
 Fahrplan Ost

St. Gallen S-Bahn lines
Transport in the canton of St. Gallen
Transport in Thurgau